John Roberts is an American record producer and electronic musician. He rose to critical acclaim with his debut album Glass Eights in 2010 and his follow-up album Fences, both released by Dial Records.

In 2009, Roberts co-founded the contemporary culture magazine, The Travel Almanac, with fellow musician Paul Kominek. In 2015, he started his own label, Brunette Editions. In 2017, he released a self-titled album under the alias Body Four.

Roberts currently resides in Los Angeles.

Discography

As John Roberts

Studio albums
 Glass Eights (2010)
 Fences (2013)
 Plum (2016)
 Can Thought Exist Without The Body (2019)
 Wrecked Exotic (2022)

As Body Four

Studio albums
 Body Four (2017)

References

External links
 
 John Roberts on Discogs

Year of birth missing (living people)
Living people
American DJs
American electronic musicians
Musicians from Cleveland
Record producers from Ohio
Electronic dance music DJs